Emil John Schmidt IV (born December 15, 1974), known professionally as Acey Slade, is an American musician, perhaps best known as the bassist of the alternative metal band Dope and the former guitarist of the horror punk and glam metal act Murderdolls. He is currently the lead singer and guitarist of the band Acey Slade & the Dark Party, and the live rhythm guitarist of Misfits. Previous to this, he served as the bassist in Joan Jett & the Blackhearts and the lead vocalist and guitarist in the punk rock band Trashlight Vision, which broke up in 2007.

Career
Played in the Moon Dragons from Baltimore Maryland Prior to Vampire Love Dols, Murderdolls and Wednesday 13, Slade played bass, and later guitar, in Dope alongside guitarist Tripp Eisen who was also part of the Murderdolls. After Eisen left Dope, Slade was moved to guitar for the album Life. He later left Dope to join the Murderdolls, again replacing Eisen on guitar. Before joining the Murderdolls (alongside his Dope work), Slade also fronted a band known as the Vampire Love Dolls.
After Murderdolls were put on hiatus in 2004 Slade filled in on guitar for punk/metal crossover band Amen for a tour of Japan.

Slade played rhythm guitar on the track "Tired 'N Lonely" on Roadrunner United for Roadrunner Records' 25-year anniversary. He collaborated on the song with Joey Jordison, who also played in the Murderdolls with Slade. After the break-up of TrashLight Vision Slade filled in as guitarist for Wednesday 13 on his 2008 tour as well as taking time to produce records by His Mighty Robot (which remains unreleased) and Billy Liar. 

Slade is one of the contributors to the book Sex Tips from Rock Stars by Paul Miles published by Omnibus Press in July 2010 and was also used as the motion-capture model for the Punk Singer and Rock Guitarist characters on the video game Rock Band 2.

Slade is currently touring and promoting his new band Acey Slade & the Dark Party, whose début album The Dark Party was released in 2010, and is also playing bass with Joan Jett & the Blackhearts and filling in on bass for the occasional tour date with former band Dope.
Slade performed second guitar for the various Original Misfits reunion sets.

In 2022 he joined the band of Rammstein-frontman Till Lindemann for the ‘Ich Hasse Kinder’ Tour.

Personal life
Slade lives in Newark, New Jersey.

Equipment

Joan Jett & the Blackhearts
 ESP Phoenix II-B bass guitars
 Ampeg SVT-CL amps
 Ampeg SVT-810E cabinets
 Boss TU-2

Acey Slade & the Dark Party 
 ESP Phoenix guitars
 ESP Eclipse-I guitars
 Peavey Penta amps
 Peavey Penta cabinets
 Boss TU-2

Other: In the past Slade has also used 
Black 35 "Ouija Board" custom guitar 

 Gibson Les Paul guitars
 Dean ML with EMGs guitars
 Dean Modern with EMGs guitars
 Gibson Firebird guitars
 BC Rich Mockingbird guitars
 ESP Vintage-4 PJ bass guitars
 Epiphone Les Paul guitars
 Hughes & Kettner guitar amps
 Marshall guitar amps
 Tech 21 SansAmp
 Hagstrom Viking bass guitar

Discography 
 1997: Vampire Love Dolls – Vampire Love Dolls (Vocals)
 1999: Felons and Revolutionaries – Dope (Bass)
 2001: Life – Dope (Guitar, backing vocals)
 2004: TrashLight Vision EP – TrashLight Vision (Vocals, guitar)
 2005: Allergic to Home EP – TrashLight Vision (Vocals, guitar)
 2005: Roadrunner United – Roadrunner Records (Rhythm guitar on "Tired 'N Lonely")
 2006: Alibis and Ammunition – TrashLight Vision (Vocals, guitar) †
 2008: Sex, Murder, Art, Baby! EP – Acey Slade (Vocals, guitar, bass) †
 2009: Black Season – His Mighty Robot (Unreleased) †
 2009: It Starts Here EP – Billy Liar (Production, backing vocals, guitar) †
 2009: She Brings Down the Moon EP – Acey Slade (Vocals, guitar, bass) †
 2009: Use It EP – Black Sugar Transmission (Vocals on "I Dare You")
 2010: The Dark Party – Acey Slade & the Dark Party (Vocals, guitar, bass) †
 2010: The After Party EP – Acey Slade & the Dark Party (Vocals, guitar, bass) †
 2010: Spin the Bottle EP – Acey Slade & the Dark Party (Vocals, guitar)
 2011: Inside the Reptile House: Live from NYC – Acey Slade & the Dark Party (Vocals, guitar)
 2012: Recognise – JD & the FDCs (Vocals on "The Secret")
 2012: Suicide Lullaby/Burn This City Down – Acey Slade & the Dark Party (Vocals, guitar) - Split 7" with JD & the FDCs
 2013: Unvarnished – Joan Jett & the Blackhearts (Bass)
 2015: Valentines for Sick Minds – Acey Slade (Vocals, bass, guitar)
 2016: Live from Moscow, Russia – Dope (bass, vocals)

† - Produced

References

External links

https://www.catfightcoffee.com

1974 births
American heavy metal bass guitarists
American heavy metal guitarists
American male bass guitarists
American male guitarists
American punk rock guitarists
Dope (band) members
Guitarists from Pennsylvania
Horror punk musicians
Living people
Murderdolls members
Place of birth missing (living people)
Rhythm guitarists